North Richland Hills/Smithfield station is a TEXRail commuter rail station in North Richland Hills, Texas.

Services

TEXRail
North Richland Hills/Smithfield was an opening day station when revenue service began on December 31, 2018. North Richland Hills councilman Tom Lombard compared the TEXRail station to the 1989 opening of the nearby Iron Horse Golf Course, adding that it would be "a big, big game-changer for us". The station were included 562 spaces of parking when were opened.

Gallery

References

External links
TEXRail
FWTA Station Concept

Railway stations in the United States opened in 2019
2019 establishments in Texas
TEXRail stations
Railway stations in Tarrant County, Texas